Paul Mills is a Canadian former pair skater. He won the 1977 World Junior Figure Skating Championships with partner Josée France. He won the silver medal at the 1978 Canadian Figure Skating Championships with Lea Ann Jackson. They went on to place eleventh at the World Figure Skating Championships.

Results
pairs with Jackson

References

Navigation

External links
 Pairs on Ice: Jackson & Mills

Year of birth missing (living people)
Living people
Canadian male pair skaters
World Junior Figure Skating Championships medalists